Solon Ménos (9 March 1859 – 14 October 1918) was a Haitian author and politician. Born in Anse-à-Veau, Ménos studied in France and received a doctorate in law there at the age of twenty-two. A prominent politician, Ménos served as Haiti's minister to Washington, D.C., and Minister of Finance in 1897. He was a poet and the author of L'Affaire Lüders, which described the conflict between Haiti and Germany during Tirésias Simon Sam's presidency.

References

 

1859 births
1918 deaths
Haitian male poets
Foreign Ministers of Haiti
Finance ministers of Haiti
Haitian politicians
Ambassadors of Haiti to the United States
19th-century Haitian poets
20th-century Haitian poets
19th-century male writers
20th-century male writers